Sean McFarlane (born 4 April 1993) is a Jamaican professional footballer.

Career

Club
McFarlane played college soccer at Saint Leo University and Florida International University. He has also appeared for National Premier Soccer League sides Chattanooga FC and Tampa Bay Rowdies 2.

McFarlane signed for United Soccer League side Colorado Springs Switchbacks 9 February 2017.

In September 2018, it was announced that McFarlane would join United Soccer League expansion side Austin Bold for the 2019 season.

On 6 January 2021, McFarlane signed with USL Championship side Miami FC.

In June 2022, McFarlane was sent to FC Tulsa on loan for the remainder of the 2022 USL Championship season.

International 
McFarlane has been capped at the Under-20 level for Jamaica.

Career statistics

Club

Honors
Miami FC
 Sunshine Conference Championship: 2018
 South Region Championship: 2018
 National Championship: 2018

References

External links
 

1993 births
Living people
Jamaican footballers
FIU Panthers men's soccer players
Tampa Bay Rowdies 2 players
Colorado Springs Switchbacks FC players
USL Championship players
National Premier Soccer League players
Jamaican expatriate footballers
Jamaican expatriate sportspeople in the United States
Expatriate soccer players in the United States
Association football defenders
Soccer players from Florida
Sportspeople from Kingston, Jamaica
2015 CONCACAF Gold Cup players
Austin Bold FC players
Chattanooga FC players
Miami FC players
FC Tulsa players
Jamaica under-20 international footballers